was a children's TV series created by Osamu Tezuka that combined marionettes with traditional animation. It ran for two seasons from April 7, 1963 to April 1, 1965, for a total of 92 episodes. The series also aired in France as Le Commando De La Voie Lactée.

The characters were represented by marionettes from the Takeda Puppet Troupe, while scenes of rocket flight were represented with animation. Occasionally, the producers incorporated live-action film of characters' lips moving superimposed on the puppets, in an effect similar to the little-used American Syncro-Vox technique.

In the first season, the eponymous Galaxy Boy Troop, headed by a boy named Rob, travels across the galaxy to find a material that can restart Earth's dying Sun. In the second season, the Troop fights off an alien invasion of Earth. Along the way, they meet and interact with the elegant Amia people of Venus, and the oafish Poipoi people of Mars.

Characters
Although the show is primarily puppetry, it still manages to include many characters from Osamu Tezuka's Star System in marionette form.

Rob, the leader of the Galaxy Boy Troop
Myria
Shunsaku Ban
Mister 6, Rob's intelligent robot hovercar
Pedro
Dar, a small, big-eyed alien
Tex, a reformed criminal
Rubber Band
Death, the villain

See also
Supermarionation

References

External links
Official site at Tezuka Osamu @ World
Clip on YouTube

Osamu Tezuka
1963 Japanese television series debuts
1965 Japanese television series endings
Japanese television shows featuring puppetry
NHK original programming